16α-Iodo-E2, or 16α-iodoestradiol, is a synthetic, steroidal, potent estrogen with slight preference for the ERα over the ERβ that is used in scientific research. The KD of 16α-iodo-E2 for the ERα is 0.6 nM and for the ERβ is 0.24 nM, a 4-fold difference in affinity, whereas estradiol is considered to have similar affinity for the two receptor subtypes. Unlike the case of the much weaker estriol (16α-hydroxyestradiol), 16α-iodo-E2 is considered to be equipotent with estradiol in terms of estrogenic activity. Radiolabeled [16α-125I]iodo-E2 has been employed in imaging to study the estrogen receptor.

See also
 16α-LE2
 Clomestrone
 Mytatrienediol
 GTx-758

References

Estranes
Organoiodides
Synthetic estrogens